The 1976 Preakness Stakes was the 101st running of the $200,000 Grade 1 Preakness Stakes thoroughbred horse race. The race took place on May 15, 1976, and was televised in the United States on the CBS television network. Elocutionist, who was jockeyed by John L. Lively, won the race by three and one half lengths over runner-up Play The Red. Approximate post time was 5:40 p.m. Eastern Time. The race was run on a fast track in a final time of 1:55 flat.  The Maryland Jockey Club reported total attendance of 62,256, this is recorded as second highest on the list of American thoroughbred racing top attended events for North America in 1976.

Payout 

The 101st Preakness Stakes Payout Schedule

$2 Exacta:  (4–2) paid   $347.40

The full chart 

 Winning Breeder: Pin Oak Stud (KY)
 Winning Time: 1:55 0/0
 Track Condition: Fast
 Total Attendance: 62,256

References

External links 
 

1976
1976 in horse racing
1976 in American sports
1976 in sports in Maryland
May 1976 sports events in the United States
Horse races in Maryland